Collingwood Lakeshore Estates is an organized hamlet in the Rural Municipality of McKillop No. 220, Saskatchewan, Canada.

Government 
Collingwood Lakeshore Estates has a three-member organized hamlet board that is chaired by Francesca Carteri-Bitz. The board reports to the Rural Municipality of McKillop No. 220 as its administering municipality.

References

External links 

McKillop No. 220, Saskatchewan
Organized hamlets in Saskatchewan
Division No. 6, Saskatchewan